Bruno Guttowski (8 November 1924 — 4 July 1977) was a German ice hockey player. He won the German championship with KEV in 1952 and was said to be one of the best defensemen in Germany three times. In 1955 he moved to Mannheim where he started as coach of the MERC. The following season he joined the team as defenseman and scored 71 goals for Mannheim in 8 seasons. When scoring his last goal in 1964 he was 39 years, one month and 28 days old and remains, as of 2013, the oldest scorer of the MERC.

Guttowski participated in 58 matches and 10 world championships for his national team.  He represented Germany in the 1956 Winter Olympics. Guttowski died in 1977 at the age of 52. He is member of the Hockey Hall of Fame Germany. On November 23. 2012 the Adler Mannheim retired his #12.

References

External links
 

1924 births
1977 deaths
German ice hockey defencemen
Ice hockey players at the 1956 Winter Olympics
Olympic ice hockey players of Germany
Olympic ice hockey players of the United Team of Germany
People from Kętrzyn
Sportspeople from Warmian-Masurian Voivodeship